Jimmy Santos may refer to:

 Jimmy Santos (singer), Afro-Uruguayan vocalist
 Jimmy Santos (actor) (born 1951), Filipino actor, comedian, TV host and former basketball player